Saphenista parvimaculana is a species of moth of the family Tortricidae. It is found in California, United States.

The wingspan is about 11 mm.

References

Moths described in 1879
Saphenista